Petar Gluhakovic (born 25 March 1996) is an Austrian footballer who plays as a right back.

International career
Gluhakovic was born in Austria and is of Croatian descent. He is a youth international for Austria.

References

External links
 OEFB Profile
 OEFB National Profile

1996 births
Living people
Austrian footballers
Association football defenders
Austria under-21 international footballers
Austria youth international footballers
Austrian people of Croatian descent
Austrian Football Bundesliga players
2. Liga (Austria) players
Austrian Regionalliga players
Croatian Football League players
Liga I players
FK Austria Wien players
SKN St. Pölten players
NK Lokomotiva Zagreb players
FC Dinamo București players
Expatriate footballers in Romania
Austrian expatriate sportspeople in Romania